Nezavisimaya Gazeta is a Russian daily newspaper.

History and profile
Nezavisimaya Gazeta was first published on 21 December 1990. It was one of the most important daily newspapers in the early post-Soviet period, when it was seen as close to the opinion of the Moscow intelligentsia. The paper was temporarily closed for four months in 1995. Then it became part of the "Berezovsky Media Group".

In 2007, following Berezovsky's political and economical disgrace, Nezavisimaya Gazeta was bought by Konstantin Remchukov, who became the new editor-in-chief, and his wife Yelena. Following the acquisition, the paper became mildly critical of the Putin administration. For example, it criticized the Kremlin's tightening control over the Central Election Commission and the Russian Academy of Science and in 2014 it was openly critical towards the annexation of Crimea by the Russia Federation. Nevertheless, Nezavisimaya Gazeta is much more moderate towards the Russian government than radical opposition publications, such as Novaya Gazeta and Meduza.

Information ranging from a wide variety of sources, such as reporters, political scientists, historians, art historians, as well as critics is published in the newspaper. The newspaper also offers eight supplements and covers the issues of politics, society, culture and art.

References

External links
 

Publications established in 1990
Russian-language newspapers published in Russia
Newspapers published in Moscow